Cheshmeh Langan Rural District is a rural district (dehestan) in the Central District of Fereydunshahr County, Isfahan Province, Iran. At the 2006 census, its population was 3,031, in 705 families.  The rural district has 8 villages.

References 

Rural Districts of Isfahan Province
Fereydunshahr County